Ivan Vladislav Point (‘Nos Ivan Vladislav’ \'nos i-'van vla-di-'slav\) is a point on the north coast of Rugged Island off the west coast of Byers Peninsula of Livingston Island in the South Shetland Islands, Antarctica formed by an offshoot of Cherven Peak.  Situated 1.63 km west-northwest of Herring Point, 400 m east-northeast of Simitli Point, and 3.27 km east-southeast of Cape Sheffield.

The point is named after Czar Ivan Vladislav of Bulgaria, 1015-1018 AD.

Location
British mapping in 1968, Spanish in 1993 and Bulgarian in 2009.

Maps
 Península Byers, Isla Livingston. Mapa topográfico a escala 1:25000. Madrid: Servicio Geográfico del Ejército, 1992.
 L.L. Ivanov. Antarctica: Livingston Island and Greenwich, Robert, Snow and Smith Islands. Scale 1:120000 topographic map.  Troyan: Manfred Wörner Foundation, 2009.  
 Antarctic Digital Database (ADD). Scale 1:250000 topographic map of Antarctica. Scientific Committee on Antarctic Research (SCAR). Since 1993, regularly upgraded and updated.
 L.L. Ivanov. Antarctica: Livingston Island and Smith Island. Scale 1:100000 topographic map. Manfred Wörner Foundation, 2017.

References
 Ivan Vladislav Point. SCAR Composite Gazetteer of Antarctica
 Bulgarian Antarctic Gazetteer. Antarctic Place-names Commission. (details in Bulgarian, basic data in English)

External links
 Ivan Vladislav Point. Copernix satellite image

Headlands of the South Shetland Islands
Bulgaria and the Antarctic